Doyana may refer to several places in Burkina Faso:

Doyana, Coalla
Doyana, Piéla
Doyana, Thion